Severny is a rural locality (a village) in Almukhametovsky Selsoviet, Abzelilovsky District, Bashkortostan, Russia. The population was 292 as of 2010. There are  3 streets.

Geography 
Severny is located 41 km southeast of Askarovo (the district's administrative centre) by road. Sukhoye Ozero is the nearest rural locality.

References 

Rural localities in Abzelilovsky District